= Kona Sonbarsa =

Village in Uttar Pradesh

Kona Sonbarsa is a village in Gorakhpur, Uttar Pradesh, India.
